Shakadza is a village in Musina Local Municipality in Vhembe District Municipality in the Limpopo province of South Africa. Shakadza shares borders with neighboring villages Muswodi, Mukovhawabale, Tshokotshoko, Gundani, and Tshamutora. The village is divided into four parts: Mavhuvhuni, Tshivhambe, Thondoni 1 and Thondoni 2.

References

Populated places in the Musina Local Municipality